Martin Manurung (born 31 May 1978) is an Indonesian politician who has been a Nasdem Party Member of the People's Representative Council since 2019.

He was educated at the University of Indonesia (BA Economics, 2001) and was a Chevening Scholar at the University of East Anglia (MA Development Studies, 2007).

References

1978 births
Living people
University of Indonesia alumni
Alumni of the University of East Anglia
Members of the People's Representative Council, 2019
21st-century Indonesian politicians
People from Jakarta
Chevening Scholars